En vivo desde el Teatro Real (translated to Live from the Royal Theater in English) is a live album by Paco de Lucía recorded on February 18, 1975 at the Teatro Real in Madrid, Spain. He was accompanied by his brother Ramón de Algeciras on stage.

Track listing
"Alegrías" – 5:15
"Tarantas" – 6:04
"Granaínas" – 6:22
"Zapateado" – 4:19
"Soleá" – 5:20
"Fandangos" – 4:17
"Guajiras" – 4:56
"Rumba" – 8:54

Musicians
Paco de Lucía - Flamenco guitar
Ramón de Algeciras - Flamenco guitar

References
 Gamboa, Manuel José and Nuñez, Faustino. (2003). Paco de Lucía. Madrid:Universal Music Spain.

Paco de Lucía live albums
1975 live albums